Biological Conservation is a peer-reviewed journal of conservation biology. The journal was established in 1968, and is published monthly by Elsevier. The current Editor-in-Chief is Vincent Devictor (Institute of Evolutionary Sciences of Montpellier) .

The journal is affiliated with the Society for Conservation Biology.

Abstracting and indexing
The journal is abstracted and indexed in the following databases:

References

External links

Biology journals
Elsevier academic journals
Publications established in 1968
English-language journals
Monthly journals